Alexandra de la Mora (born May 12, 1979) is a Mexican actress.

Filmography

Film roles

Television roles

References

External links 
 

1980 births
Living people
Mexican film actresses
Mexican television actresses
21st-century Mexican actresses
Actresses from Monterrey